Jakob Meyer zum Hasen (1482 in Basel – 1531 in Freiburg im Breisgau) was the bürgermeister of the city of Basel from 1516 to 1521. A money changer by profession, he was the first bürgermeister of Basel to be a tradesman, belonging to a guild rather than a member of the aristocracy or a wealthy family. He is known as a patron of the painter Hans Holbein the Younger, having commissioned the Darmstadt Madonna  and a double portrait from him.

Biography 
He was born in Basel as the son of a merchant. He used to change money in the House "To the Rabbit" (dt. Zum Hasen), which was situated at the location of the tower of the current town hall. From 1503 onwards he was accepted as a member several guilds, such as the guild of the Hausgenossen like all money changers, then also the one of the wine merchants and then the one of the locksmiths. By 1508 he was so rich that he purchased the Castle of Gross Gundeldingen in the suburbs of Basel. From 1510 and 1515 he was the Master of the Guild zu Hausgenossen. In 1515, the Grand Council of Basel cancelled the tradition according to which the mayor had to be of the local aristocracy. and Meyer became the mayor of Basel in 1516. In the same year, he commissioned a double portrait with his second wife Dorothea Kannengießer from Hans Holbein the Younger. As the mayor of Basel, he sacked the castle of Pfeffingen. He remained the mayor of Basel until 1521, the year he was accused of receiving secret pensions from France. Von Hasen and six other grand councillors were expelled form the Grand Council following which he was imprisoned. After his release he re-entered the Grand Council of Basel, where he was a member of the Catholic Party. In later years he went into voluntary exile to Freiburg im Breisgau, where he died in 1531.

Military career 
In his twenties he was a member of the Swiss soldiers in service of the French, Italian or Papal nobility which was a lucrative business at the time. In 1507 he joined Amboise to reconquer Genoa. Later in his foreign military service, he often changed sides. First he fought for France, then for Pope Julius II against France. In 1510 he served Matthäus Schiner in Ferrara. He led a contingent of Basler warriors in the conquest of Milan in 1512 and the same year was also the leader of the Swiss emissaries who instated Maximilian Sforza as the Duke of Milan.

Personal life 
He was married twice and his grandchild Rosa Irmi would marry Remigius Faesch, another mayor of Basel.

References

Further reading 
All of the following sources are in German.

 Martin Alioth, Ulrich Barth, Dorothee Huber: Basler Stadtgeschichte. Vol. 2, Basel 1981.
 Bodo Brinkmann: Der Bürgermeister, sein Maler und seine Familie: Hans Holbeins Madonna im Städel. Imhof, Petersberg 2004, .
 : Geschichte der Stadt Basel. Vol. 3, Basel, 1924, Reprint 1968.

External links 
 Biography of Meyer on www.altbasel.ch

Politicians from Basel-Stadt
1482 births
1531 deaths
Swiss politicians
Swiss Roman Catholics
Swiss mercenaries